The Diliman Commune was an uprising led by the students, faculty members, and residents of the University of the Philippines Diliman, together with transport workers, on February 1–9, 1971, in protest of the three centavo increase in oil prices midway through the second term of the  Marcos administration—about a year after the events of the First Quarter Storm and about a year before Marcos' eventual declaration of Martial Law.

The name was a reference to an intentional community established by the protesters patterned after the Paris Commune of 1871. Like the supporters of Paris Commune, the protesters referred to themselves as Communards. They renamed the University of the Philippines Diliman campus to "Malayang Komunidad ng UP Diliman" ("Free Commune of UP Diliman"). They also took control of the DZUP radio station and the UP Press, and ran their own publication called the Bandilang Pula ("Red Flag").

See also 
 University of the Philippines Diliman
 Martial Law under Ferdinand Marcos
 First Quarter Storm

References 

Protests in the Philippines
University of the Philippines Diliman
February 1971 events in Asia
1971 establishments in the Philippines
Communes